Threespot damselfish is a common name for several fishes and may refer to:

Dascyllus trimaculatus
Stegastes planifrons